Yuridia "Yuri" Valenzuela Canseco (born, 6 January 1964) is a Mexican singer, actress and television host. Yuri began her career as a teenage singer in her native country. In 1978 she released her first album titled Tú Iluminas mi Vida. She gained recognition as a result of her participation in the Oti Festival in 1980. In the 1980s and early 1990s, Yuri established herself as one of the most popular pop music singers in Mexico and Latin America. Her vocal quality and versatility allow her to be incorporated into other musical genres, ranging from pop to dance, ranchera and tropical music genres. Thanks to her success and influence, she came to be considered the "Queen of Latin Pop".

In the mid-1990s, Yuri put a pause on her musical career and during some years she dedicated herself to the interpretation and preaching of Christian music and gospel. In 2002, she returns to commercial music with much greater impact than her first season as a pop singer. Since the mid-2000s and during this decade, Yuri has established herself as one of the most successful interpreters of Spanish music. She has released a total of 29 studio albums and has sold more than 30 million copies worldwide. Parallel to her role as a singer, Yuri has also ventured into acting. She has participated in some telenovelas and films and has served as a host in some television shows in her native country. In 2018, she received the Latin Grammy Lifetime Achievement Award at the 19th ceremony, making her the youngest artist (at the age of 54) to win this award.

Biography

Early life
Yuridia Valenzuela Canseco was born on January 6, 1964, in Veracruz. She is the daughter of doctor Carlos Humberto Valenzuela and Dulce Canseco. She had two brothers, Carlos (deceased) and Yamily. During her childhood and in parallel with her training at the school in her native Veracruz, Yuri studied classical dance and won, in a competition at the age of 11, a scholarship to the Bolshoi Ballet of Russia, which did not take advantage because her parents prevented her. In compensation, her mother decided to promote her as a singer. Dulce decided to create a musical concept called La Manzana Eléctrica. Yuri took singing classes in different spaces and the group debuted in 1976, performing in various local venues in Veracruz, where they performed covers of artists such as Michael Jackson and Janis Joplin. Given the local success and thanks to the charisma and popularity of Yuri, the group was renamed Yuri y La Manzana Eléctrica. It was at this stage that Yuri became friend with the popular singer Celia Cruz, since Yuri and her band used to act as support band for Cruz's performances in Veracruz. During a presentation of the group, the director of art and repertoire, and arranger Julio Jaramillo Arenas, of the record label GAMMA, discovered the potential of the singer and proposed to record her first album. Her mother accepted the proposal, and from that moment on she became her manager. They moved to Mexico City, but without the financial support of the family.

Julio Jaramillo produced her first album titled Tú Iluminas mi Vida, which included the Spanish version of You Light Up My Life, by the American singer Debby Boone, which was her first national single. However, the album did not achieve the desired success. However, Yuri gave the opportunity to perform her first acting work in the movie Milagro en el circo (1979), starring Mexican comedian Cepillín and collaborated in the program En familia con Chabelo on the Televisa network.

In 1979, Yuri participated in the OTI Festival, in the Mexican eliminatory, and was disqualified because the theme "Siempre habrá un mañana" was an alleged plagiarism of the song "MacArthur Park" of the American singer Donna Summer. However, the jury awarded her, by unanimous vote, the prize for the "Female revelation of the festival", in addition to being the youngest interpreter to participate in the festival.

1980s
In 1980, and also under the production of Jaramillo Arenas, Yuri recorded her second album, Esperanzas, with which she achieved her first great commercial success with the theme Esperanzas. In that same year, she debuted as a television actress in the popular Mexican telenovela Colorina, starring Lucía Méndez, for the Televisa network. Eventually she also acts in the telenovela Veronica, with Christian Bach. Heralbum was also released in Central America, South America, the Caribbean and the United States. The singles Primer amor, Goma de mascar and Regresaré be placed in the first places of popularity in all Latin America.

In 1981, she competed for the second time at the OTI Festival and won the third place in Mexico and the Award for the best female performer with the theme Deja, composed by the singer José María Napoleón. The following year, Yuri launches her third album titled Llena de dulzura. The album was described as a Gold Record in all Latin America, thanks to the songs "Mi timidez", "Llena de dulzura", "Tu y yo", "Este amor no se toca" and Maldita Primavera (Spanish version of the song "Maledetta primavera", by Italian singer Loretta Goggi). She also became the first Latin American singer to obtain a Gold Record in Spain. In that same year she recorded the single "El panda de Chapultepec", dedicated to the first panda bear born in captivity outside of China, whose single sold over a million units and was later included in a re-issue of the album.

In 1983 the success continued with her fourth album, titled Yuri: Sí, soy así, which includes one of her greatest hits: "Yo te amo, te amo". She also filmed her second movie: Secuestro en Acapulco, alongside the Venezuelan boyband Los Chamos.

In 1984, Yuri released her fifth album entitled Karma Kamaleón. This production contains the Spanish version of the song "Karma Chameleon", from the British group Culture Club. She triumphed in the national competition and represented Mexico in the international stage, where he obtained the third place and the "Prize for the best performer of the festival". The same year she was invited to the Viña del Mar International Song Festival in Chile, and obtained the longed for Silver Torch, with which she became the first Mexican singer to obtain this award.

In 1985 she signed a contract with EMI music and recorded the album Yo te pido amor, with which she won a Grammy Award nomination. The singer placed on the radio throughout Latin America with the successes songs, "Yo te pido amor", "Déjala" and "Dame un beso". Months later, Yuri appeared in Playboy magazine, in a study conducted under the lens of Pompeo Posar. The magazine's sales skyrocketed, even though Yuri never appeared nude.

In 1986, Yuri released the album Un corazón herido. The singles released were "Es ella más que yo", "Hoy me he vuelto a enamorar" and "Un corazón herido". The following year she would participate for the last time in the OTI Festival with the songs "La locura de vivir". This is perhaps the biggest failure of her artistic career because she only obtained a vote of the jury and she was eliminated because her presentation is crossed of very bold.

In 1988 the successful album Aire was released. The singles "Cuando baja la marea", "Qué te pasa" and "Amores clandestinos", they manage to conquer the first places of popularity in the whole American continent. "Qué te pasa" got the record in Billboard Hot Latin Tracks as the song that was the longest in number one in the whole decade of the 1980s, position in which he would remain for 16 consecutive weeks, and for a total of 33 weeks in the list.

In the face of such success, Marcos Maynard and Manuel Calderón of CBS (now Sony Music) hired her for their ranks. From there came the album Isla del Sol, which included rhythms such as dance, rap, pop, rock and ballad and successfully placed singles such as "Hombres al Borde de un Ataque de Celos" (with which he returned to number one on Billboard Hot Latin Tracks ), "Imposible amarte como yo", "No puedo más" and "Hola". "Hola" was nominated as best video to the Grammy Awards. She was awarded the Premios Lo Nuestro Award for Latin music. Even years later, the album enters the Brazilian market. In parallel, Yuri recorded a duet with Don Johnson, the Spanish version of "A Better Place". Taking advantage of the great success of Yuri, her old record label, EMI, launches the album Algo de mi vida, which included songs already recorded by Yuri, but which were not published in Mexico.

In September 1989 Yuri released the album Sui Generis from which came the single releases, "Embrujada" and "Me tienes que querer".

1990s
After divorcing her first husband, Yuri gave a turn to her career, and recorded under the direction of producer Mariano Pérez the album Soy Libre, same that three months after going on the market had sold more than half a million copies and which are the singles: "Quién eres Tu", "Todo mi corazón" and "El apagón".

For the second time, Yuri appears in Playboy and presented a show entitled Sin límites, which receives the recognition of the public and critics for its outstanding quality, which led the press and her fans to compare it with the singer Madonna: the nickname "the Mexican Madonna", which sparked such controversy that even important American programs, such as Hard Copy, took time to talk about this similarity. In 1991, Yuri resumed her role as an actress and filmed the movie Soy libre, directed by Juan Antonio de la Riva and where she alternates with Omar Fierro and Christian Bach.

In 1992, Yuri released her twelfth album, titled Obsesiones, which is again produced by Mariano Pérez. The album includes the song "Decir adiós", Spanish version of the song "As Time Goes By". The album also includes the song "Química perfecta", a duet with the Salsa singer Luis Enrique, as well as "Así es la vida" and "Poligamia".

In 1993, Yuri released the album Nueva era with the producer Alejandro Zepeda, which contains the songs "Detrás de Mi Ventana" (written by Ricardo Arjona), "Amiga mía" and "Si falta el amor". Also they sound in some countries the "Celia Mix" a medley of some hits of Celia Cruz.

In 1994, Yuri returned to television but now as host of the comic-musical show ¡No te muevas!. In that same year, she agreed to star in the Mexican telenovela Volver a empezar, starring alongside the Puerto Rican singer Chayanne for the Televisa network. In 1995, she performed again at Viña del Mar Festival. The pace of work devastated her health and a tumors were detected in her the vocal cords, which led her to fall into depression. In that year she released the album Espejos del Alma, which would obtain regular success on the radio due to the few presentations by Yuri for her health problems. Yuri was received in the Catholic Church in 1987 so that she could be married through the church with her first husband, Iriarte. In 1994, Yuri left the Catholic Church and caused a stir by embracing Protestantism and adhering to the Evangelical church. As an actress, she starred in the Christian film Altos instintos. Yuri participates in the album Boleros por amor y desamor, under the label of Fonovisa and in which he interprets the theme "El espejo".

In 1996, Yuri recorded the Ranchera album Más Fuerte que la Vida, a disc that included some of her hits in the ranchera version and the Christian song that gave the album its name. During 1997 Yuri filmed the autobiographical film, Yuri, mi verdadera historia. In the film she reflects her unhappiness despite her triumphs, fame and money. Also, lets see the frivolity of the middle of the stardom, which caused controversy at the time of release. She began to witness her conversion in countless forums. Also recorded the audio-cassette entitled Mi testimonio, which is distributed only in Protestant bookstores throughout Latin America, to tell their approach to God.

Following this logic, the following year she is invited by Manolo Calderón to be part of the Polygram label and records the Gospel album Huellas. Yuri leaves behind her public image of sex symbol and writes the song "María Magdalena". The single "Hoy que estamos juntos", a duet with her second husband Rodrigo, is quickly removed from the top ten by the version of Jennifer Lopez and Marc Anthony with a very different letter on the lack of love, as Yuri spoke of God in her version.

Yuri's successful record career began to decline and, due to these changes, and Yuri's indifference to continue in secular music, she would lose fans and contracts. She began to dedicate herself solely to her Christian audience, and she performed concerts with songs of praise and testimony of faith. When the single "Ven y tócame" was distributed, Yuri considered retiring from the stage.

2000s
Yuri decides to return to secular music in mid-2001 convinced by her fans and makes some television appearances with new arrangements of her former successes. It was not until 2002 that Yuri returns formally with the release of her album Enamorada, where she leaves religious themes aside and takes up the themes of love. From this album there is a single success, the bachata "Ya no vives en mí". She also performs a special performance in the children's telenovela Vivan los niños.

In 2003, Yuri would sign again with Sony Music and record a ranchera music album, called Yuri/A lo Mexicano, at the request of the label, which includes duets with renowned artists such as Vicente Fernández, Ana Bárbara, Mijares and Pandora.

In 2004, and for three consecutive seasons, Yuri became the host of the reality show Objetivo Fama, recorded in Puerto Rico, and in 2006 a cover album was released with Mijares, entitled Acompáñame, whose first single "Callados", manages to be placed in the public's taste. The album obtained platinum disc, although in the radio it does not achieve the desired success. At the same time, she started the Cantar por cantar Tour, together with Mijares and Ricardo Montaner. In addition, she participated as part of the jury of the reality show Cantando por un sueño, from the Televisa network with Montaner, Adrián Posse and Susana Zabaleta for three seasons.

Yuri leaves Sony Music and in 2007 she presented a concert of successes at the Teatro de la Ciudad in Mexico City, which is recorded for a DVD and CD, published at the beginning of September of the same year with the title Vive la Historia, in which it includes the unreleased song "Y llegaste tú", of the album Acompáñame, which is quickly placed in the first places, and won recognition for its high sales.

In January 2008, Manolo Calderón invited her to be part of the Televisa EMI Music label. Televisa also invites her to animate the late night show Noche de estrellas, in which the duets in which Yuri participated with her guest artists were popularized, of which the ones she performed with Lupita D'Alessio, Enrique Iglesias and Juanes.

In December of the same year her new Latin pop album Mi Hijita Linda was released, where she recorded, at the request of the label, old-style cumbanchero themes that pretended to continue with the concept of "El Apagón", as well as including a duet with DJ Flex: "La mucura".

In 2009, Yuri is presented with great success in the Auditorio Nacional of Mexico City. She signed with Warner Music and on October 20 a CD-DVD of her concerts in the Auditorio Nacional, called El concierto, was released.

2010s (present)
In 2010, under the production of Scott Erickson, Yuri releases the album Inusual, who got a gold record just two days after it was released. This record achieves success in countries like Chile and Mexico and from it comes the single "Arrepentida" and "Estoy Cansada", as well as some covers by Argentine singer Valeria Lynch. She also recorded the central theme of the Chilean TV series Infiltradas, entitled "Por el amor de un hombre", and was present at the Viña del Mar Festival in 2011 as a jury.

On September 27, 2011, she released the album, Mi tributo al Festival, where she pays homage to the late OTI Festival. In this album, Yuri interprets in a masterful way the winning songs of this festival. The first single is "Ay amor", by singer-songwriter Ana Gabriel. Yuri released the second part of this album in 2012 using the song "El triste", popularized by José José, as a single. In the same year she was the host of a late night show aired on Saturdays of every month, called Una noche con Yuri for Televisa.

In August 2014, Yuri announced her participation as coach of the fourth season of the Mexican version of The Voice alongside Ricky Martin, Laura Pausini and Julión Álvarez. In September of the same year, a second single titled "Duele" was released, playing alongside the Mexican band Reik. The same name album went on sale on April 14, 2015, in physical and digital record stores.

In 2016, Yuri signs a new contract with Sony Music and starts working on her new album Yuri en Primera Fila, a record recorded live with her hits and new songs. In February 2017, the first unpublished single of the disc is released, entitled "Perdón".

In 2017, Yuri became the host of the Mexican edition of The Voice Kids, and in the middle of the same year she repeated as coach in the sixth season of Mexican version of The Voice alongside Carlos Vives, Maluma and Laura Pausini . In 2018, she served as coach in The Voice Kids in Colombia.

In 2018, Yuri ventured into musical theatre for the first time with the musical Cats in its Mexican version playing the character Grizabella. In the same year, the Latin Academy of Recording Arts & Sciences awarded Yuri the Latin Grammy Award to musical excellence in a ceremony held in Las Vegas.

In 2019, Yuri joined forces with the Mexican group Pandora to perform a musical tour.

Image, voice and influence
Yuri has always shown her admiration for artists like Rocío Dúrcal, Madonna, Michael Jackson, Janet Jackson, Cher and Celia Cruz, among others. Likewise, she has managed to influence musically on many artists in the Hispanic market, such as: Yuridia, María José, Alejandra Guzmán and Shakira, among others, and has become an important part of the musical culture of Mexico and Latin America.

Several of her songs are part of the successful musical Mentiras, based on Latin musical successes of the 1980s, similarly there is a character named Yuri in her honor.

Yuri has one of the most prodigious voices in Latin music in history, and has a wide vocal record. She is known for being one of the few Latin singers of the 1980s who are still active in the market, due to her capacity for evolution and skills as an artist. Yuri is a professional dancer, so she easily includes dances and choreographies in her concerts, which include costume changes, visual screens, dancers and set design, elements that are rare in Latin artists and much less in her generation. She has been known for including the genre pop and ballad on her albums, but throughout her career she has included various rhythms, such as rock, bolero, salsa, Ranchero, gospel and many more.

Personal life
In 1988, Yuri married the publicist Fernando Iriarte, (son of Mexican journalist Maxine Woodside) in a Catholic ceremony. The marriage ended in divorce in 1990.

From 1995 to date, Yuri is married to Chilean singer and Evangelical Pastor, Rodrigo Espinoza. In 2009, she announced her motherhood with the adoption of a 7-month-old girl named Camila.

Discography

Tours
Invencible Tour : 2015-2016

Filmography
Milagro en el circo (1978)
Secuestro en Acapulco (1983), also known as Canta Chamo
Siempre en domingo (1983)
Soy libre (1991)
Altos instintos (1995)
Yuri, mi verdadera historia (1997)

Telenovelas (Mexican soap operas)
Colorina (1982)
Verónica (1983)
Volver a empezar (1994)
¡Vivan los niños! (2002)
La fea más bella (2006)

Awards and recognitions1979Revelation Award Of The Mexican OTI 1979.1980Gold Record for selling 1,000,000 copies of her album Esperanzas1981Double platinum record and gold for selling almost 2,000,000 copies of her album Llena de Dulzura. This album obtains gold record in Spain, the first gold record awarded to a Latin American singer for the sales over 50,000 copies only in Spain. Llena de Dulzura also recognized gold record because of the highest sales in Colombia, Ecuador, Brasil, Chile, Perú and Panamá.
Award "Galardón a los Grandes'" from the TV show Siempre en Domingo.1982Named by the Mexican OTI as The Best Singer Of The Year for the song "Deja"
Award Galardón a los Grandes from the TV show Siempre en Domingo.
Gold record in Spain (first Latin American woman to win a gold record)
4 platinum records and 1 gold record for her album Oso Panda de Chapultepec, 2,000,000 copies sold.1983Award in Spain as "International Revelation"
Award "'Galardón a los Grandes" from the TV show Siempre en Domingo.1984First place nationwide at the Mexican OTI for the song "Tiempos Mejores" and awarded best Interpreter, and third place with the same song at the international OTI festival.
The "Antorcha de Plata" at the Viña del Mar Festival: Best Female Performance
Award "Galardón a los Grandes'" from the TV show Siempre en Domingo.
Karma Kamaleón obtains platinum and gold records for selling 700,000 copies.1985Gold and platinum record for selling over 600,000 copies of Yo de pido amor1986Nominated for US Grammy for the song "Yo te pido amor".
Platinum record for selling 250,000 copies of Un corazón Herido
Award Galardón a los Grandes from the TV show Siempre en Domingo.1987Her native Veracruz held a tribute in her honor.
Her album Aire obtained platinum certification for selling over 700,000 copies.1988Award Lo Nuestro from the Latin US TV network Univisión for her album Aire
Platinum record for selling over 350,000 copies of Isla del Sol
Award "Galardón a los Grandes" from the TV show Siempre en Domingo.
EMI released a compilation album named 15 éxitos de Oro (15 Gold Hits) that she had when working for EMI Capitol. This received platinum and gold records for selling over 350,000 copies, one of her most successful compilation albums.1989TVyNovelas Award as "Singer With Most International Projection"
Award "Galardón a los Grandes" from the TV show Siempre en Domingo.1990ACE Award to the most outstanding singer of the year.
ERES award for Best Performance.
Gold and platinum records for sales of 350,000 copies of her album Suigeneris
Award "Galardón a los Grandes" from TV show Siempre en Domingo.
Confesiones de Amor, another compilation album released by EMI reaches 100,000 sold copies.
ERES magazine chose the album Suigeneris as one of the ten most important albums in Spanish of 1990.1991Gold and platinum records for selling 300,000 copies of her album Soy Libre
Two "Gaviotas de Plata" (Silver Seagulls) at the Viña del Mar Festival.
Títle of "Miss Simpatía" (Miss Congeniality) and the "Artista más popular" (Most Popular Artist) at the Viña del Mar Festival.
Queen Of The Viña del Mar Festival.
Special recognition from TVyNovelas as "Best International Singer"
ERES award for Best Performance.
Award "Galardón a los Grandes" from TV show Siempre en Domingo.1992"Aplauso" Award as Best Female.
Queen Of The Veracruz Canival.
ERES Award for Best Performance.
TvyNovelas Award For "Proyección en el extranjero" (International projection)
Award "Galardón a los Grandes" from TV show Siempre en Domingo for the song "El Apagón"
Platinum record for over 260,000 sales of her album Obsesiones
ERES magazine chose the album Obsesiones as one of the 10 most important albums in Spanish of 1992.1993ERES Award as Best Female Singer.
ERES Award for Best performance.
Double gold record for selling over 250,000 copies in México of her album Nueva Era
Gold record In United States for selling over 200,000 copies.
Award "Galardón a los Grandes" from TV show Siempre en Domingo.
ERES magazine chose the Album Nueva Era as one of the 10 most important albums in Spanish of 1993.1994ERES Award for Best Soap Opera Song "Volver a empezar"
ERES Award For Best Female performance.
TvyNovelas Award for the highest rating in a TV soap opera in the United States with Volver a empezar
Gold record for selling 100,000 copies of the album Reencuentros.1995ERES Award For Best Female performance.
Gold record for her album Espejos del Alma.1997Homage for her 25 years of artistic career on the TV show Siempre en Domingo.
Award "Galardón a los Grandes" from the TV show Siempre en Domingo.1998Gold record for her album Huellas for selling over 150,000 copies.
Gold record in Puerto Rico ofor her album Huellas for selling 50,000 copies.2006Platinum record for 100,000 sales of her album Acompañame in duet with Mijares.2007Oye Award for 30 years of artistic career.
Homage in Premios oye for her long and successful career.2008'''
Wax statue in the Veracruz Museum recognizing her important legacy as a Veracruzan in music.
Gold and platinum records for her live album Yuri, Vive La Historia'' for selling over 100,000 copies.

References

External links

 
 

1964 births
Living people
Mexican women singers
Mexican child actresses
Mexican film actresses
Mexican telenovela actresses
Singers from Veracruz
Actresses from Veracruz
People from Veracruz (city)
CBS Records artists
Ballad musicians
Latin Grammy Lifetime Achievement Award winners
Converts to Protestantism from Catholicism
Mexican Christians
Mexican Protestants
Women in Latin music